The 2nd Rhode Island Regiment (also known as Hitchcock's Regiment and the 11th Continental Infantry) was authorized on 6 May 1775 under Colonel Daniel Hitchcock in the Rhode Island Army of Observation and was organized on 8 May 1775 as eight companies of volunteers from Providence County of the colony of Rhode Island. As part of a brigade organized under Nathanael Greene, the unit participated in the Siege of Boston during the remainder of 1775. Some elements accompanied Benedict Arnold's expedition to Quebec late in the year. The unit was renamed the 11th Continental Regiment on the first day 1776.

In its new designation, the regiment fought in the New York and New Jersey campaign starting in August 1776. After retreating across New Jersey, the unit was renamed the 2nd Rhode Island Regiment and fought at Assunpink Creek and Princeton in early January. Hitchcock died soon after and the 2nd Regiment was ordered away to defend the Hudson River valley. In September 1777 the regiment, now under Colonel Israel Angell, was recalled to the main army for the Philadelphia Campaign. With the 1st Rhode Island Regiment, it won a victory at Red Bank in October 1777. Portions of the unit defended Fort Mifflin where the 2nd Regiment's Major Simeon Thayer assumed command of the fort near the end of the siege.

In 1778 the regiment fought at the battles of Monmouth and Rhode Island. In June of the following year it was in the thick of action at Springfield in New Jersey. On 1 January 1781, the regiment was consolidated with the 1st Regiment and the new unit was renamed the Rhode Island Regiment. For the unit's subsequent history, see the 1st Rhode Island Regiment.

Regiment history

Hitchcock's Regiment (1775)
Shortly after the Battles of Lexington and Concord, the General Assembly of Rhode Island decided to raise a brigade of three regiments to join the Army of Observation during the Siege of Boston.

The three regiments were organized in May 1775.  The regiment from Providence County was placed under the command of Colonel Daniel Hitchcock, for whom it was named as the Continental Army did not have numerical designations of units at that time.  (The other two regiments were then known as Varnum's Regiment (raised in Kent and Kings Counties) and Church's Regiment (raised in Newport and Bristol Counties).  Shortly after the regiments were organized, they marched north to Boston under the command of Brigadier General Nathanael Greene.

The Regiment would see action at Roxbury, Massachusetts during the Battle of Bunker Hill in June.  The regiment was expanded to ten companies on 28 June 1775.  It was adopted into the Continental Army when General George Washington arrived in Cambridge and took command on 3 July 1775.  It was assigned to Greene's Brigade on 22 July 1775.

11th Continental Infantry (1776)
The regiment was re-organized as the 11th Continental Infantry on 1 January 1776.  Following the British evacuation of Boston in March, the regiment, along with the bulk of the Continental Army, was redeployed to defend New York City.  The British landed in force on Long Island in September 1776 and defeated the inexperienced Continentals at the Battle of Long Island.

The last engagements of the 11th Continental Infantry were the Battles of Trenton and Princeton in early January 1777.

2nd Rhode Island Regiment (1777–1781)
The regiment was re-organized as the 2nd Rhode Island Regiment after the death of Colonel Hitchcock on 13 January 1777.  Colonel Israel Angell was placed in command of the regiment. In late 1777 it fought at the Battle of Red Bank and Major Simeon Thayer of the 2nd led the defenders during the latter part of the Siege of Fort Mifflin.   The 2nd Rhode Island spent the winter of 1778 at Valley Forge.

In 1778 the 2nd Rhode Island Regiment distinguished itself at the Battles of Monmouth and the Rhode Island.  From late 1778 to December 1780 the regiment was assigned to Starks's Brigade in the Main Army based in Morristown, New Jersey.

The regiment's last major engagement was the Battle of Springfield in June 1780, where the regiment lost six killed, 31 wounded and three missing out of a strength of 160.  The regiment also fought in several other skirmishes and minor engagements before being consolidated with the 1st Rhode Island Regiment in 1781.

Consolidation (1781)
In February 1781, the 2nd Rhode Island Regiment was combined with the remnants of the 1st Rhode Island Regiment to form the Rhode Island Regiment (1781–1783).  The Rhode Island Regiment served until British evacuated New York and was finally disbanded on 25 December 1783.

Service record

Significant campaigns and battles
Siege of Boston (1775–1776)
Battle of Long Island (1776)
Battle of Trenton (1777)
Battle of Princeton (1777)
Morristown, New Jersey (1777)
Battle of Red Bank (1777)
Siege of Fort Mifflin (1777)
Valley Forge (1777–1778)
Battle of Monmouth (1778)
Battle of Rhode Island (1778)
Morristown, New Jersey (1779–1780)
Battle of Springfield (1780)

Senior Officers

Colonels
Daniel Hitchcock; 3 May 1775 – 13 January 1777 (died)
Israel Angell; 13 January 1777 – 31 December 1780 (retired)

Lieutenant Colonels
Ezekiel Cornell; 3 May 1775 – October 1776 (discharged, promoted to brigadier general in the Rhode State Troops)
Israel Angell; October 1776 – 13 January 1777 (promoted)
Jeremiah Olney; 13 January 1777 – 31 December 1781 (transferred to the Rhode Island Regiment as Lieutenant Colonel Commandant)

Majors
Israel Angell; 3 May 1775 – October 1776 (promoted)
Christopher Smith; October 1776 – 31 December 1777
Simeon Thayer; 1 January 1777 – 31 December 1780 (retired and promoted to brigadier general in the Rhode Island Militia)

Note – The dates shown are the dates of rank.  In many cases promotions were late and the date of rank was retroactively conferred.

Notes

References
Archambault, Alan H. "The Second Rhode Island Regiment of the Continental Line 1775–1777." Military Collector and Historian, 28 (Fall 1976), p. 133.
Archambault, Alan H. and Marko Zlatich. "Rhode Island Regiment, 1781–1783." Military Collector and Historian, 36 (Summer 1984), p. 77.
Boyle, Joseph Lee "Death Seem'd to Stare": The New Hampshire And Rhode Island Regiments at Valley Forge Clearfield Co, 1995 
Brown, Anne S. K. "Rhode Island Uniforms in the Revolution." Military Collector and Historian, 10 (Spring 1958), pp. 1–10.
Gardiner, Asa B. The Rhode Island Line in the Continental Army and Its Society of Cincinnati. Providence: Providence Press Co., 1878.
Hitchcock, Dan. "So Few the Brave (The Second Rhode Island 1777–1781)." Military Collector and Historian, 30 (Spring 1978), pp. 18–22.
Lovell, Louise Lewis and Eben Putnam. Israel Angell, colonel of the 2nd Rhode Island regiment. New York: The Knickerbocker press (G.P. Putnam's sons), 1921.

Walker, Anthony. So Few The Brave (Rhode Island Continentals 1775-1783). Newport: Seafield Press, 1981.

External links
2nd Rhode Island Regiment Interview (video)
Bibliography of the Continental Army in Rhode Island compiled by the United States Army Center of Military History

2nd Rhode Island Regiment